In Greek mythology, Tithorea (Ancient Greek: Τιθορεα) a Phocian nymph of Mount Parnassus, from whom the town of Tithorea, previously called Neon, was believed to have derived its name. She was possibly a dryad.

Note

References 

 Pausanias, Description of Greece with an English Translation by W.H.S. Jones, Litt.D., and H.A. Ormerod, M.A., in 4 Volumes. Cambridge, MA, Harvard University Press; London, William Heinemann Ltd. 1918. . Online version at the Perseus Digital Library
 Pausanias, Graeciae Descriptio. 3 vols. Leipzig, Teubner. 1903.  Greek text available at the Perseus Digital Library.
 Smith, William. Dictionary of Greek and Roman Biography and Mythology, London (1873). "Gaea"

Nymphs
Dryads